The Scientific Advisory Group for Emergencies (SAGE) is a British Government body that advises central government in emergencies. It is usually chaired by the United Kingdom's Chief Scientific Adviser, currently Sir Patrick Vallance. Specialists from academia and industry, along with experts from within government, make up the participation, which will vary depending on the emergency. SAGE gained public prominence for its role in the 2020 COVID-19 pandemic in the United Kingdom.

History
In the aftermath of the United Kingdom BSE outbreak, "the then Government Chief Scientific Adviser (Lord May) published Guidelines on the Use of Scientific Advice in Policy-Making; these have subsequently been revised, most recently in June 2010... The Government [later] developed the Principles of Scientific Advice to Government, which 'set out the rules of engagement between Government and those who provide independent scientific and engineering advice.' The Principles apply to 'Ministers and Government departments, all members of Scientific Advisory Committees and Councils [...] and other independent scientific and engineering advice to Government.' They detail principles related to roles and responsibilities, independence and transparency and openness." The May advice was updated in May 2011 in a document entitled Code of Practice for Scientific Advisory Committees (CoPSAC 2011).

"In an emergency where scientific or technical advice is required to aid the emergency response, the Government may decide that a" SAGE "is required; this decision can either be made by the Lead Government Department (LGD) or the Cabinet Office in consultation with the Government Office for Science. SAGE is usually chaired by the Government Chief Scientific Adviser... Each SAGE is emergency-specific. The swine flu pandemic was the first emergency where the SAGE mechanism was used; volcanic ash was the second."

SAGE has advised the government on a number of events, including:
 the 2009 flu pandemic
 the 2010 eruptions of Eyjafjallajökull
 the 2011 Fukushima nuclear accident
 the 2013–14 United Kingdom winter floods (3 meetings)
 the 2014 Ebola outbreak (3 meetings)
 the 2015 Nepal earthquake (1 meeting)
 the 2015–16 Zika virus epidemic (5 meetings)
 the 2018-9 Ebola outbreak (3 meetings)
 the potential catastrophic breach of Toddbrook Reservoir in 2019 (1 meeting)
 the COVID-19 pandemic (at least 105 meetings)

Structure and function
SAGE was reported in July 2020 to consist of around 20 participants at any one given time. Participants are drawn from both academia and practice, and the participants of a particular meeting are decided upon by the British Government Chief Scientific Adviser and the Chief Medical Officer for England, depending on the expertise required. They are not generally employed by government. They do not operate under government instruction. In addition to these participants, SAGE is also attended by officials from relevant parts of government and arm's-length bodies who may contribute to discussions with relevant expertise, for instance, the UK Health Security Agency and the Chief Scientific Advisers to government departments.

The government does not have to act upon the conclusions of SAGE, and other bodies, including other sources of scientific advice, feed in to government's decisions. Only the Chief Scientific Adviser and Chief Medical Officer may speak on behalf of SAGE.

In 2020, the UK Government carried out a review of SAGE's structure in the context of the COVID-19 pandemic.

Sub-committees can be delegated by SAGE to study particular issues. During the COVID-19 pandemic, these were:
Scientific Pandemic Insights Group on Behaviours (SPI-B)
Scientific Pandemic Influenza Group on Modelling (SPI-M) and its the Operational sub-group (SPI-M-O); the sub-group was awarded the Weldon Memorial Prize in 2022 for its work in the COVID-19 pandemic
PHE Serology Working Group
COVID-19 Clinical Information Network (CO-CIN)
Environmental Modelling Group (EMG)
Children’s Task and Finish Working Group (TFC)
Hospital Onset COVID-19 Working Group (HOCI)
Ethnicity Subgroup
Social Care Working Group (SCWG)

COVID-19
The 2020 COVID-19 pandemic has seen an expanded role for and greater attention paid to SAGE.

Although not prohibited, until the 2020 COVID-19 pandemic, it is believed that political advisors had never attended SAGE meetings in any capacity nor is there evidence for 10 Downing Street officials attending these meetings too. It was reported that Dominic Cummings and Ben Warner had attended COVID-19 meetings. Their attendance and participation was widely criticised, in particular by other attendees "shocked, concerned and worried for the impartiality of advice".

Early in the pandemic, in April 2020, SAGE was criticised for a lack of transparency. For their security and safety, and on advice from the Centre for the Protection of National Infrastructure, the list of current members was not disclosed, although members could, and many did, reveal their own membership. Chris Whitty, speaking to the Health and Social Care Select Committee regarding the COVID-19 meetings of SAGE and the anonymity of its members, said that SAGE was "given quite clear advice from the Centre for the Protection of National Infrastructure, basically based on the fact that SAGE is a sub-committee of COBRA". Patrick Vallance argued in a letter to Parliament that scientists were protected by the anonymity from "lobbying and other forms of unwanted influence".

Membership of SAGE and its subcommittees was published on 4 May 2020. A register of participants' interests was first published in December 2020.

Participants

April 2020 
A report in The Guardian stated that attendees at an April 2020 meeting of the group included:

Senior advisers:

 Sir Patrick Vallance, Chief Scientific Adviser (chair)
 Professor Chris Whitty, Chief Medical Adviser

Medical and scientific experts:

 Professor John Aston, statistician, Chief Scientific Adviser to the Home Office
 Dr Meera Chand, microbiologist
 Sir Ian Diamond, National Statistician
 Professor John Edmunds, epidemiologist
 Sir Jeremy Farrar, medical researcher
 Professor Neil Ferguson, epidemiologist
 Professor Peter Horby, epidemiologist
 Professor Angela McLean, mathematical biologist
 Professor Graham Medley, epidemiologist
 Dr Edward Mullins, clinical adviser
 Professor Sharon Peacock, microbiologist
 Professor Stephen Powis, national medical director for England
 Professor Andrew Rambaut, molecular biologist
 Emma Reed, emergency planner
 Professor Brooke Rogers, social psychologist
 Dr James Rubin, psychologist
 Professor Jonathan Van-Tam, influenza specialist, Deputy Chief Medical Officer for England
 Professor Charlotte Watts, epidemiologist, Chief Scientific Advisor to the Department for International Development
 Professor Maria Zambon, virologist

Political advisers:

 Dominic Cummings
 Dr Ben Warner, data scientist

Vallance has written that SAGE includes scientists and experts from more than twenty separate institutions. SAGE also contains four expert groups which may each have as low as five and as many as over forty members.

Dominic Cummings was confirmed by 10 Downing Street to have attended a 23 March meeting, but the government said Cummings was not a member of SAGE. The attendance and participation by Prime Ministerial advisors caused much criticism. It was reported that one participant considered that Cummings' interventions had sometimes inappropriately influenced what is supposed to be an impartial scientific process; another expressed shock when Cummings first began participating in SAGE discussions, in February, viewing this as unwanted political influence on what should be "unadulterated scientific data".

May 2020
In May 2020, Professor Neil Ferguson resigned from SAGE after The Telegraph revealed he had violated lockdown rules to meet with a partner. The same day of his resignation, a list of SAGE participants was published by the UK Government, 4 May 2020. However, it notes that: "Permission to publish names was requested from all participants. Those who did not give permission have not been named." In addition: "These meetings are also regularly attended by officials from Her Majesty’s Government. These attendees have not been named." No reason for the secrecy is provided. Two attendees did not give permission to be named. Attendees as of May 2020 included:

 Sir Patrick Vallance, Government Chief Scientific Adviser
 Professor Chris Whitty, Chief Medical Officer (England) and Chief Scientific Adviser, Department of Health and Social Care
 Professor John Aston, Chief Scientific Adviser, Home Office
 Professor Wendy Barclay, Imperial College London
 Professor Phil Blythe, Chief Scientific Adviser, Department for Transport
 Professor Sir Ian Boyd, University of St Andrews
 Professor Andrew Curran, Chief Scientific Adviser, Health and Safety Executive
 Dr Gavin Debrera, Public Health England
 Professor Sir Ian Diamond, National Statistician, Office for National Statistics
 Professor Yvonne Doyle, Medical Director, Public Health England
 Professor John Edmunds, London School of Hygiene and Tropical Medicine
 Professor Sir Jeremy Farrar, Director, Wellcome Trust
 Dr Aidan Fowler, National Health Service England
 Professor Julia Gog, University of Cambridge
 Dr David Halpern, Behavioural Insights Team, Cabinet Office
 Dr Jenny Harries, Deputy Chief Medical Officer
 Dr Demis Hassabis, Personal capacity as a data scientist
 Professor Peter Horby, University of Oxford
 Dr Indra Joshi, NHSX
 Professor Dame Theresa Marteau, University of Cambridge
 Professor Dame Angela McLean, Chief Scientific Adviser, Ministry of Defence
 Professor Graham Medley, London School of Hygiene & Tropical Medicine
 Professor Andrew Morris, University of Edinburgh
 Professor Carole Mundell, Chief Scientific Adviser, Foreign and Commonwealth Office
 Professor Catherine Noakes, University of Leeds
 Dr Rob Orford, Welsh Government
 Professor Michael Parker, University of Oxford
 Professor Sharon Peacock, Public Health England
 Professor Alan Penn, Chief Scientific Adviser, Ministry of Housing, Communities and Local Government
 Professor Stephen Powis, National Health Service England
 Dr Mike Prentice, National Health Service England
 Mr Osama Rahman, Chief Scientific Adviser, Department for Education
 Professor Venki Ramakrishnan, ex-officio as Chair of DELVE, convened by the Royal Society
 Professor Andrew Rambaut, University of Edinburgh
 Professor Tom Rodden, Chief Scientific Adviser, Department for Digital, Culture, Media and Sport
 Professor Brooke Rogers, King's College London
 Dr James Rubin, King's College London
 Professor Calum Semple, University of Liverpool
 Dr Mike Short, Chief Scientific Adviser, Department for International Trade
 Dr Gregor Smith, Scottish Government, Chief Medical Officer
 Professor Sir David Spiegelhalter, University of Cambridge
 Professor Jonathan Van-Tam, Deputy Chief Medical Officer
 Professor Russell Viner, University College London
 Professor Charlotte Watts, Chief Scientific Adviser, Department for International Development
 Professor Mark Walport, UK Research and Innovation
 Professor Mark Woolhouse, University of Edinburgh
 Professor Lucy Yardley, University of Bristol
 Professor Ian Young, Northern Ireland Executive
 Professor Maria Zambon, Public Health England

July 2020 
In July 2020, the participants list was updated to reflect recent meetings. Professor Neil Ferguson was featured on the list. As of 19 November, the list remains unchanged and includes:

 Sir Patrick Vallance FMedSci FRS, Government Chief Scientific Adviser
 Professor Chris Whitty CB FMedSci, Chief Medical Officer (England) and Chief Scientific Adviser, Department of Health and Social Care
 Professor Rebecca Allen, University of Oxford
 Professor John Aston, Chief Scientific Adviser, Home Office
 Professor Charles Bangham Imperial College London
 Professor Wendy Barclay FMedSci Imperial College London
 Professor Jonathan Benger UWE Bristol
 Fliss Bennee, Welsh Government
 Mr Allan Bennett, Public Health England
 Professor Phil Blythe, Chief Scientific Adviser, Department for Transport
 Professor Chris Bonnell, London School of Hygiene and Tropical Medicine
 Professor Sir Ian Boyd FRSE, University of St Andrews
 Professor Peter Bruce, University of Oxford
 Caroline Cake, HDR-UK
 Professor Andrew Curran, Chief Scientific Adviser, Health and Safety Executive
 Professor Paul Cosford, Public Health England
 Dr Gavin Dabrera, Public Health England
 Professor Sir Ian Diamond FRSE FBA, National Statistician, Office for National Statistics
 Professor Yvonne Doyle CB, Medical Director, Public Health England
 Professor Deborah Dunn-Walters, University of Surrey
 Professor John Edmunds OBE FMedSci, London School of Hygiene and Tropical Medicine
 Professor Sir Jeremy Farrar FMedSci FRS, Director, Wellcome Trust
 Professor Michael Ferguson, University of Dundee
 Professor Neil Ferguson OBE FMedSci, Imperial College London
 Professor Kevin Fenton, Public Health England
 Dr Aidan Fowler FRCS, National Health Service England
 Professor Julia Gog, University of Cambridge
 Professor Robin Grimes, Chief Scientific Adviser, Ministry of Defence
 Dr Ian Hall, University of Manchester
 Dr David Halpern, Behavioural Insights Team, Cabinet Office
 Dido Harding, NHSI
 Dr Jenny Harries OBE, Deputy Chief Medical Officer
 Dr Demis Hassabis FRS, Personal capacity as a data scientist
 Professor Andrew Hayward, UCL
 Professor Gideon Henderson, Chief Scientific Adviser, Defra
 Professor Peter Horby, University of Oxford
 Professor Anne Johnson, UCL
 Dr Indra Joshi, NHSx
 Dr Vittal Katikireddi, University of Glasgow
 Dr Ben Killingley, UCLH
 Professor David Lalloo, Liverpool School of Hygiene and Tropical Medicine
 Professor Janet Lord, University of Birmingham
 Professor Dame Theresa Marteau FMedSci, University of Cambridge
 Professor Dame Angela McLean FRS, Chief Scientific Adviser, Ministry of Defence
 Dr Jim McMenamin, Health Protection Scotland
 Professor Graham Medley, London School of Hygiene & Tropical Medicine
 Dr Laura Merson, University of Oxford
 Professor Susan Michie FAcSS FMedSci, University College London
 Professor Christine Middlemiss, Chief Veterinary Officer
 Professor Andrew Morris FMedSci FRSE, University of Edinburgh
 Professor Paul Moss, University of Birmingham
 Professor Carole Mundell, Chief Scientific Adviser, Foreign and Commonwealth Office
 Professor Catherine Noakes, University of Leeds
 Dr Rob Orford, Welsh Government
 Professor Michael Parker, University of Oxford
 Professor Sharon Peacock FMedSci, Public Health England
 Professor Alan Penn, Chief Scientific Adviser, Ministry of Housing, Communities and Local Government
 Dr Pasi Penttinen, European Centre for Disease Prevention and Control
 Professor Guy Poppy, Chief Scientific Adviser, Food Standards Agency
 Professor Steve Powis FRCP, National Health Service England
 Dr Mike Prentice, National Health Service England
 Mr Osama Rahman, Chief Scientific Adviser, Department for Education
 Professor Venki Ramakrishnan PRS, Ex Officio as Chair of DELVE, convened by the Royal Society
 Professor Andrew Rambaut FRSE, University of Edinburgh
 Professor Tom Rodden, Chief Scientific Adviser, Department for Digital, Culture, Media and Sport
 Professor Brooke Rogers OBE, King's College London
 Dr Cathy Roth, Department for International Development
 David Seymour, HDR-UK
 Professor Sheila Rowan MBE FRS FRSE, Chief Scientific Adviser, Scotland
 Alaster Smith, Department for Education
 Professor Iyiola Solanke, University of Leeds
 Dr Nicola Steedman, Scottish Government
 Dr James Rubin, King's College London
 Professor Calum Semple, University of Liverpool
 Dr Mike Short CBE, Chief Scientific Adviser, Department for International Trade
 Dr Gregor Smith, Scottish Government Chief Medical Officer
 Professor Sir David Spiegelhalter FRS, University of Cambridge
 Professor Jonathan Van Tam MBE, Deputy Chief Medical Officer
 Professor Russell Viner PRCPCH, University College London
 Professor Charlotte Watts CMG FMedSci, Chief Scientific Adviser, Department for International Development
 Dr Rhoswyn Walker, HDR-UK
 Professor Sir Mark Walport FRCP FMedSci FRS, UK Research and Innovation
 Professor Mark Wilcox, University of Leeds
 Professor Lucy Yardley FAcSS, University of Bristol and University of Southampton
 Professor Ian Young, Northern Ireland Executive
 Professor Maria Zambon FMedSci, Public Health England

March 2021

The following were included on the minutes of a 11 March meeting:

Scientific experts:

Patrick Vallance (GCSA)
Chris Whitty (CMO)
Angela McLean (MOD)
Calum Semple (Liverpool)
Catherine Noakes (Leeds)
Charlotte Deane (UKRI)
Charlotte Watts (FCDO CSA)
Chris Dye (Royal Society)
Chris Savoury (DHSC)
Clare Gardiner (DHSC)
Colin Humphreys (Queen Mary)
David Crossman (Scotland)
Derek Smith (Cambridge)
Fliss Bennee (Wales)
Graham Medley (LSHTM)
Harry Rutter (Bath)
Ian Boyd (St Andrews)
Ian Diamond (ONS)
James Rubin (KCL)
Jeanelle de Gruchy (ADPH)
Jenny Harries (DHSC)
Jeremy Farrar (Wellcome)
John Edmunds (LSHTM)
Kamlesh Khunti (Leicester)
Linda Partridge (Royal Society)
Lucy Yardley (Bristol/Southampton)
Maria Zambon (PHE)
Mark Walport (UKRI)
Mark Wilcox (NHS)
Michael Parker (Oxford)
Nicola Steedman (Scotland dCMO)
Paul Cleary (DHSC)
Peter Horby (Oxford)
Rob Orford (Wales Health CSA)
Sharon Peacock (PHE)
Stephen Powis (NHS England)
Stuart Elborn (QUB, Non-Executive Director of the Regulatory and Quality Improvement Agency, Northern Ireland))
Susan Hopkins (PHE/NHSTT)
Wei Shen Lim (JCVI)
Wendy Barclay (Imperial)
Yvonne Doyle (PHE)

Observers and government officials:

Achim Wolf (NHSTT)
Alan Penn (MHCLG CSA)
Andrew Curran (HSE CSA)
Andrew Morris (HDR UK)
Ben Warner (No.10)
Christopher Williams (PHW)
Daniel Kleinberg (Scotland)
Gideon Henderson (Defra CSA)
Giri Shankar (PHW)
Jennifer Rubin (HO CSA)
Jim McMenamin (HPS)
Julian Fletcher (CO)
Laura Gilbert (No.10)
Liz Lalley (WG)
Louise Tinsley (HMT)
Osama Rahman (DfE CSA)
Paul Monks (BEIS CSA)
Phil Blythe (DfT CSA)
Rob Harrison (CO)
Tom Mottershead (DHSC)
Tom Rodden (DCMS CSA)

Secretariat:

Laura Eden
Simon Whitfield
Stuart Wainwright

July 2021
The following were added to the list of participants:
Lucy Chappell (King's College London and DHSC CSA)
Paul Kellam (Imperial College London, adviser to the Vaccine Taskforce)
Thomas Waite (Deputy CMO for England, adviser to Joint Biosecurity Centre)

Criticism and developments
An April 2020 article in The Guardian written by Richard Coker cited SAGE as a potential example of "scientific groupthink" in which disagreement and/or conflicting views are minimised to reach a consensus. Although disagreement is not preferable, this may ultimately lead to potentially irrational decision-making as counter views are not encouraged.

On 24 October 2020, The Spectator, while noting that SAGE minutes are published, called for a publication of the data used by SAGE, including NHS occupancy data, that were employed by it to justify the decisions it made. The editors remarked how in France hospital occupancy data were indeed published daily, while they were told by the NHS to submit a Freedom of Information request, which can take up to 28 days.

Independent SAGE

The questions raised about the transparency of SAGE and possible political interference during the COVID-19 pandemic raised concerns about trust in public health messaging by opposition parties and others. As an alternative, a group of scientists created Independent SAGE, chaired by Sir David Anthony King, a former Government Chief Scientific Advisor, in early May 2020 to "provide a clear structure on which an effective policy should be based given the inevitability that the virus will continue to cross borders". Later that month, Independent SAGE warned against ending lock-down prematurely in places like schools.

See also

 Advisory Committee on Dangerous Pathogens (ACDP)
 Joint Committee on Vaccination and Immunisation (JCVI)
 New and Emerging Respiratory Virus Threats Advisory Group (NERVTAG)

References

External links
 
 List of participants of SAGE and related sub-groups for the COVID-19 emergency
 Meeting minutes and supporting papers for the COVID-19 emergency

Organizations with year of establishment missing
Scientific organisations based in the United Kingdom
Emergency management in the United Kingdom
Organizations associated with the COVID-19 pandemic